A col is the lowest point on a mountain ridge between two peaks; a mountain pass or saddle.

COL, CoL or col may also refer to:

Computers
 Caldera OpenLinux, a defunct Linux distribution
 , an HTML element specifying a column
 A collision signal in Ethernet

Language
 Col language, a Malayan language of Sumatra
 Columbia-Wenatchi language (ISO 639-3: col)

Places
 Col, Ajdovščina, Slovenia
 Col, Italy
 The Gaelic name for the village of Coll, Lewis, Scotland
 Colorado, United States
 Columbus, Ohio (station code: COL)
 CoL, City of London
 CoL, City of Leeds

Other uses
 Col (game), a pencil and paper map-coloring game
 Col (meteorology), a trough of lower air pressure between two high-pressure areas in the weather
 City of license, in broadcasting
 Cost of living (disambiguation)
 Columba (constellation)
 Combined Construction and Operating License, for US nuclear power reactors
 Commonwealth of Learning
 compLexity Gaming, eSports organization
 Costa Oriental del Lago, Zulia, Venezuela
 Col., military rank of colonel
 Cartridge Overall Length, an abbreviation used in handloading of firearms

See also
 
 
 Coll (disambiguation)
 Colle (disambiguation)
 Cole (disambiguation)
 Coal (disambiguation)